is a Japanese actress and Enka singer who scored a number one hit in 1975 with Anata Ni Ageru.

External links
Official website (in Japanese)

at JMDb (in Japanese)

Japanese actresses
1958 births
Living people
Actors from Fukuoka Prefecture
Musicians from Fukuoka Prefecture